The 1941 Temple Owls football team was an American football team that represented Temple University as an independent during the 1941 college football season. In its second season under head coach Ray Morrison, the team compiled a 7–2 record and was outscored by a total of 176 to 146. The team was ranked No. 13 in the AP Poll before losing to Boston College on November 1, 1941. The team played its home games at Temple Stadium in Philadelphia.

Back Andy Tomasic was selected by the Associated Press as a first-team player on the 1941 All-Eastern football team. Tackle Hank Zajkowski was named to the second team.

Schedule

References

Temple
Temple Owls football seasons
Temple Owls football